Chilly is a commune in the Haute-Savoie department in the Auvergne-Rhône-Alpes region in south-eastern France.

The commune includes the hamlets of Botilly, Coucy, Curnillex, Darogne, Ferraz, Grange bouillet, Lacry, Les Vernays, Mannecy, Mougny, Novéry, planaise, Quincy et Vers grange.

See also
Communes of the Haute-Savoie department

References

Communes of Haute-Savoie